Francisco Javier Abad Sebastián (born August 18, 1981) is a Spanish middle distance runner.

Competition record

References
 

1981 births
Living people
Spanish male middle-distance runners
Athletes (track and field) at the 2013 Mediterranean Games
Mediterranean Games competitors for Spain
21st-century Spanish people